Silene tamaranae is a species of plant in the Caryophyllaceae family.

The species is native to the Canary Islands.

References 

Flora of the Canary Islands
tamaranae